Jonathan Michel Metzl (born December 12, 1964) is an American psychiatrist and author. He is the Frederick B. Rentschler II Professor of Sociology and Psychiatry at Vanderbilt University, where he is also Director of the Center for Medicine, Health, and Society. He is the author of multiple books, including The Protest Psychosis, Prozac on the Couch, Against Health: How Health Became the New Morality, and Dying of Whiteness.

Early life and education
Metzl was born and raised in Kansas City, Missouri to a Jewish family. His father was a pediatrician and his mother was a psychoanalyst. He has three brothers, two of whom are doctors. He received two bachelor's degrees, one in biology and one in English literature, from the University of Missouri, Kansas City, where he went on to earn his M.D. He then completed his residency in psychiatry at Stanford University, where he also earned a master's degree in poetry. In 2001, while working as a psychiatrist, he earned a Ph.D. in American studies from the University of Michigan.

Academic career
Metzl joined the faculty of the University of Michigan in 1998 as director of the Rackham Interdisciplinary Institute. He became an assistant professor in the Department of Psychiatry and Women's Studies Program there in 2001 and was named Director of their Program in Culture, Health, and Medicine in 2003. In 2006, he was awarded a Guggenheim Fellowship. In 2011, he became the Frederick B. Rentschler II Professor of Sociology and Psychiatry and director of the Center for Medicine, Health, and Society at Vanderbilt University.

Views
Metzl has written of white identity in the United States being expressed through a vector of "shared resentments" rather than unifying values. He sees whiteness and white identity as increasingly prominent in Donald Trump's presidency.

References

External links
Faculty page

Living people
1964 births
Vanderbilt University faculty
People from Kansas City, Missouri
21st-century American male writers
University of Missouri–Kansas City alumni
American psychiatrists
American sociologists
20th-century American Jews
Stanford University alumni
University of Michigan alumni
University of Michigan faculty
21st-century American Jews